F23 or F-23 may refer to:

 Fluorine-23 (23F), an isotope of fluorine
 Funk F-23, an American agricultural aircraft 
 Getrag F23 transmission, an Italian 5-speed manual transmission
 Hirth F-23, an aircraft engine
 , a passenger ship requisitioned for the Royal Navy
 , a T-class destroyer of the Royal Navy
 Northrop YF-23, an American prototype fighter aircraft